Retinal rod rhodopsin-sensitive cGMP 3',5'-cyclic phosphodiesterase subunit delta is an enzyme that in humans is encoded by the PDE6D gene. PDE6D was originally identified as a fourth subunit of rod cell-specific cGMP phosphodiesterase (PDE). The precise function of PDE delta subunit in the rod specific GMP-PDE complex is unclear. In addition, PDE delta subunit is not confined to photoreceptor cells but is widely distributed in different tissues. PDE delta subunit is thought to be a specific soluble transport factor for certain prenylated proteins and Arl2-GTP a regulator of PDE-mediated transport.

Interactions 

PDE6D has been shown to interact with:

 ARL2, 
 HRAS,
 RAP1A, 
 Retinitis pigmentosa GTPase regulator  and
 Rnd1.

References

Further reading